The 1954 Chicago Cubs season was the 83rd season of the Chicago Cubs franchise, the 79th in the National League and the 39th at Wrigley Field. The Cubs finished seventh in the National League with a record of 64–90.

Offseason 
 November 30, 1953: Carl Sawatski was selected off waivers from the Cubs by the Chicago White Sox.
 December 7, 1953: Catfish Metkovich was purchased from the Cubs by the Milwaukee Braves.

Regular season

Season standings

Record vs. opponents

Notable transactions 
 April 30, 1954: Steve Bilko was purchased by the Cubs from the St. Louis Cardinals for $12,500.
 June 8, 1954: Billy Muffett was purchased by the Cubs from the Shreveport Sports.
 June 14, 1954: Luis Márquez was traded by the Cubs to the Pittsburgh Pirates for Hal Rice.
 September 8, 1954: Joe Garagiola was selected off waivers from the Cubs by the New York Giants.

Roster

Player stats

Batting

Starters by position 
Note: Pos = Position; G = Games played; AB = At bats; H = Hits; Avg. = Batting average; HR = Home runs; RBI = Runs batted in

Other batters 
Note: G = Games played; AB = At bats; H = Hits; Avg. = Batting average; HR = Home runs; RBI = Runs batted in

Pitching

Starting pitchers 
Note: G = Games pitched; IP = Innings pitched; W = Wins; L = Losses; ERA = Earned run average; SO = Strikeouts

Other pitchers 
Note: G = Games pitched; IP = Innings pitched; W = Wins; L = Losses; ERA = Earned run average; SO = Strikeouts

Relief pitchers 
Note: G = Games pitched; W = Wins; L = Losses; SV = Saves; ERA = Earned run average; SO = Strikeouts

Farm system 

LEAGUE CHAMPIONS: Des Moines, BlackwellTar Heel League disbanded, June 21, 1954

Notes

References 

1954 Chicago Cubs season at Baseball Reference

Chicago Cubs seasons
Chicago Cubs season
Chicago Cubs